The  took place at the New National Theater in Tokyo on December 30, 2016. The ceremony was televised in Japan on TBS.

Presenters 
 Yūki Amami
 Shin'ichirō Azumi (TBS announcer)

Winners and winning works

Grand Prix 
 Kana Nishino — "Anata no Suki na Tokoro"

Best Singer Award 
 Masayuki Suzuki – "Melancholia"

Best New Artist Award 
 iKon

Excellent Work Award 
 Kana Nishino — "Anata no Suki na Tokoro"
 Urashima Tarō (Kenta Kiritani) — "Umi no Koe"
 Fuyumi Sakamoto — "Onna wa daka rete ayu ni naru"
 Kyary Pamyu Pamyu — "Sai & Co"
 AKB48 – "365 nichi no kamihikouki"
 AAA – "Namida no nai Sekai"
 Hikaru Utada – "Fantôme"
 Mariya Nishiuchi — "Believe"
 Kiyoshi Hikawa — "Miren Gokoro"
 Ikimono-gakari – "Last Scene"

New Artist Award 
 iKon
 Satoshi Hayashibe
 Mizuki Hayama
 Boys and Men

Best Album Award 
 Hikaru Utada – "Fantôme"

Excellence Album Award 
 Gen Hoshino – "Yellow Dancer"
 Spitz – "Samenai"
 Back Number – "Chandelier"
 Taro Hakase – "Joy of Life"

Good Planning Award 
 V.A. – "Akaran Kun"
 Ikusaburo Yamazaki – "1936 〜your songs〜"
 Ryuun Nagai – "Kaerimite"
 V.A. – "THE PEANUTS -TRIBUTE SONGS-"
 Begin – "Sugar Cane Cable Network"
 Juju – "Snack JUJU ~Yoru no Request~ (Roppongishinjū, Love is Over)"
 Mitsuko Nakamura – "Chōhen kayō rōkyoku muhō matsu no koi 〜 Matsugorō to Yoshioka fujin 〜"
 Izumi Yukimura&Hibari Misora&Chiemi Eri – "Too Young"
 Ranka – "Tokyo Koibumi"
 RADIO FISH – "PERFECT HUMAN"
 Miki Matsukawa – "Miki no uta no tabi..."

Special Award 
 Radwimps (Movie"Your Name.")
 The Yellow Monkey
 Shirō Sagisu, Akira Ifukube (Movie"Shin Godzilla")
 Big Bang

Special Topic Award 
 Pikotaro – "PPAP (Pen-Pineapple-Apple-Pen)"

Special Honor Award 
 Toru Funamura (The fourth chairman of Japan Composer's Association)

Achievement Award 
 Isao Saito
 Daisuke Shiga
 Kiyoko Suizenji
 Masao Sen
 Shunichi Makaino

Special Achievement Award 
 Yûmi Ito (singer of "The Peanuts")
 Rokusuke Ei (Screenwriter, Lyricist)
 Kisōtetsu (Member of "Dark Ducks")
 Sasaki Kō (Member of "Dark Ducks")
 Isao Tomita (Composer, Synthesizer player)

Encouragement Award by Japan Composer's Association 
 Sanae Jōnouchi
 Yutaka Yamakawa

Best Composer Award 
 Chiaki Oka – "Inochi no koi" (Original Artist:Mika Shinno)

Best Songwriter Award 
 Fumihiko Hara – "Aki Koiuta" (Original Artist:Kaori Kozai)

Best Arranger Award 
 Sekai no Owari – "Hey Ho" (Original Artist:Sekai no Owari)

References

External links
 

2016
Japan Record Awards
Japan Record Awards
Japan Record Awards
Japan Record Awards